The Best of the Alan Parsons Project is the name of two albums:

The Best of the Alan Parsons Project (1983 album)
The Best of the Alan Parsons Project (2002 album)